Ligue Régional II is the sixth-highest division in the Algerian football league system. The division has sixteen groups based on the region of the clubs in the country, with each region having two groups; Groupe A and Groupe B, each group contains 16 teams from their respective regions. The league is governed by the Algerian Football Federation and the presidents of each region for each group(s).

Regional leagues
The regional leagues are as follows:
Ligue Régionale de football de Alger
Ligue Régionale de football de Annaba
Ligue Régionale de football de Batna 
Ligue Régionale de football du Sud-Ouest (Béchar)
Ligue Régionale de football de Blida
Ligue Régionale de football de Constantine
Ligue Régionale de football de Oran
Ligue Régionale de football de Ouargla
Ligue Régionale de football de Saïda

References

External links
Ligue Régionale de football de Alger official site   
Ligue Régionale de football de Annaba official site 
Ligue Régionale de football de Batna official site 
Ligue Régionale de football du Sud-Ouest (Béchar) official site
Ligue Régionale de football de Blida official site 
Ligue Régionale de football de Constantine official site 
Ligue Régionale de football de Oran official site 
Ligue Régionale de football de Ouargla official site 
Ligue Régionale de football de Saïda official site

6